The National Bank of Kuwait (NBK) was founded in 1952. It is the largest financial institution in Kuwait. With branches and subsidiaries in China, Geneva, London, Paris, New York and Singapore. And a regional presence across the Middle East in Lebanon, Jordan, Egypt, Bahrain, Saudi Arabia, Iraq, Turkey, and the UAE.

The group reported a net profit after non-controlling interests of KD 370.7 million compared to KD 322.4 million for 2017, an increase of 15%. Operating profit amounted to KD 606.9 million as compared to KD 557.2 million in 2017, an increase of 8.9%. Net interest income and net income from Islamic financing at KD 690.5 million reflects a 9.8% increase on 2017 (KD 629 million). Net fees and commissions at KD 150.2 million reflects an 8.4% increase on 2017 (KD 138.6 million). Net gains from dealing in foreign currencies amounted to KD 39 million in 2018 as compared to KD 33.7 million in 2017. Operating expenses amounted to KD 276.3 million, as compared to KD 265.4 million in 2017. The cost to income ratio for 2018 improved to 31.3% as compared to 32.3% in 2017. Provision charge for credit losses and impairment losses amounted to KD 179.7 million, as compared to KD 188.2 million in 2017. The return on average equity at 12% in 2018 compared to 10.8% in 2017.

History and profile
The idea of National Bank of Kuwait started in 1952; a meeting was held with the Amir of Kuwait, Abdullah Al Salem Al Sabah, who issued a decree on 19 May 1952 to establish the National Bank of Kuwait, and NBK started operating through a small branch on 15 November 1952. NBK grew to be one of the largest banks in the region.

NBK reported net profits of USD 898.7 million (KD 272.4 million) for the first nine months of 2018 on the net growth of 14.3% year-on-year. NBK has 68 branches in Kuwait,  and a total of 143 branches worldwide. It has branches, subsidiaries and representative offices in Geneva, London, Paris, New York, Singapore, and China, and a regional presence in Lebanon, Jordan, Iraq, Egypt, Bahrain, Qatar, Saudi Arabia, UAE, and Turkey.

Subsidiaries

Boubyan Bank is 58.6% owned by the Bank. It was established in 2004.
NBK (International) PLC (United Kingdom) is a wholly owned subsidiary of the Bank  in London which provides retail, private and corporate banking, treasury and trade finance related services.
NBK (Lebanon) S.A.L. (Lebanon)'' is 85.5% owned by the Bank and provides retail, commercial and private banking and real estate related services through a network of ten branches.NBK Banque Privee (Suisse) S.A. (Switzerland) is a wholly owned subsidiary of the Bank headquartered in Geneva. In addition to traditional banking services, it provides portfolio management services, family trust, advisory, and custody services to individuals with high net worth.Credit Bank of Iraq S.A. (Iraq) is 75% owned by the Bank and provides retail and commercial banking services through a network of fourteen branches in Iraq.NBK Investment Management Limited (United Kingdom) is a wholly owned subsidiary of the Bank and provides asset management services to Kuwaiti government agencies and high-net-worth customers.National Investors Group Holdings Limited (Cayman Islands) is a wholly owned subsidiary of the Bank and was established as an investment company.NBK Capital Company (Kuwait) is 99.9% owned by the Bank and was established in July 2005 as a subsidiary of NBK. NBK Capital focuses on four principal lines of business: Alternative Investments, Asset Management, Brokerage & Research and Investment Banking. Offices in Kuwait, Dubai, Turkey, and Cairo.Al Watany Bank of Egypt S.A.E. is 98.5% owned by the bank and provides retail, private and corporate banking, treasury and trade finance related services.Watani Financial Brokerage Company is 86.7% owned by the bank and provides brokerage services.

Investment in associatesInternational Bank of Qatar (IBQ), the affiliate of NBK in Qatar, 30% is owned by the Bank. It is one of the oldest financial institutions in Qatar and celebrated its 50th anniversary in 2006. It has a network of many branches and service centers, and ATMs in strategic locations throughout Qatar. It offers a range of corporate, private, and retail banking products and services. This operation was sold early in 2015.Turkish Bank''' is 30% owned by the Bank.

NBK International Advisory Board
NBK was the first bank in the Middle East to establish an international advisory board. The Bankers' Roundtable is a subgroup comprising the banking and financial specialist contingent of the parent Advisory Board.

NBK Chairman

Financial performance 
For the year 2022, National Bank of Kuwait has posted a net profit of USD 1.7 billion.

References

Company Overview Report On Bloomberg

External links

Banks established in 1952
Banks of Kuwait
Companies based in Kuwait City
Kuwaiti companies established in 1952
Companies listed on the Boursa Kuwait